Sugar Creek Township is one of thirteen townships in Parke County, Indiana, United States. As of the 2010 census, its population was 322 and it contained 154 housing units.  The township includes the north half of Turkey Run State Park.

History
Sugar Creek Township was established in 1855.

The Lancelot C. Ewbank House, Richard Lieber Log Cabin, Lusk Home and Mill Site, Narrows Covered Bridge, and Wilkins Mill Covered Bridge are listed on the National Register of Historic Places.

Geography

Unincorporated towns
 Grange Corner at 
 Lusks Mills at 
(This list is based on USGS data and may include former settlements.)

Cemeteries
The township contains these two cemeteries: Bristleridge and Cashatt.

Major highways
  U.S. Route 41

School districts
 Turkey Run Community School Corporation

Political districts
 State House District 42
 State Senate District 38

References
 
 United States Census Bureau 2009 TIGER/Line Shapefiles
 IndianaMap

External links
 Indiana Township Association
 United Township Association of Indiana
 City-Data.com page for Sugar Creek Township

Townships in Parke County, Indiana
Townships in Indiana